The 2021 FIVB Volleyball Girls' U18 World Championship was the 17th edition of the FIVB Volleyball Girls' U18 World Championship, contested by the women's national teams under the age of 18 of the members of the  (FIVB), the sport's global governing body. The final tournament was held in Durango City, Mexico. Mexico were chosen as the hosts for this event for the second time after previously hosting the 2007 tournament.

United States were the defending champions, but lost in the semifinals to Italy.

Qualification
A total of 20 teams qualified for the final tournament. In addition to Mexico who qualified automatically as hosts, the other 19 teams qualified from five separate continental competitions, which were held by 31 December 2020 at the latest. However, due to the ongoing global COVID-19 pandemic and subsequent impact on some Confederations’ ability to organise the events within the given deadline, the FIVB has decided to postpone the deadline for continental qualifications to 28 February 2021. Additionally, in the case of no Continental Confederations being able to hold qualifying event, teams qualified according to the respective Continental Rankings.

* Japan, China, and South Korea withdrew from the competition. Bulgaria, Egypt and Slovakia entered by the world ranking.

Pools composition

Pool standing procedure
 Number of matches won
 Match points
 Sets ratio
 Points ratio
 If the tie continues as per the point ratio between two teams, the priority will be given to the team which won the last match between them. When the tie in points ratio is between three or more teams, a new classification of these teams in the terms of points 1, 2 and 3 will be made taking into consideration only the matches in which they were opposed to each other.

Match won 3–0 or 3–1: 3 match points for the winner, 0 match points for the loser
Match won 3–2: 2 match points for the winner, 1 match point for the loser

Preliminary round

Pool A

|}
* Cameroon was forced to withdraw team did not come to competition and their games were forfeited.

|}

Pool B

|}

|}

Pool C

|}
* Nigeria was forced to withdraw team did not come to competition and their games were forfeited.

|}

Pool D

 

|}

|}

Final round
All times are Mexico Central Daylight Time (UTC-05:00).

17th–18th places

|}

|}

Final sixteen

Round of 16

}
}
}
}
}
}
}
}
|}

9th–16th quarterfinals

}
}
}
}
|}

Quarterfinals

}
}
}
}
|}

13th–16th semifinals

}
}
|}

9th–12th semifinals

}
}
|}

5th–8th semifinals

}
}
|}

Semifinals

}
}
|}

15th place match

}
|}

13th place match

}
|}

11th place match

}
|}

9th place match

}
|}

7th place match

}
|}

5th place match

|}

3rd place match

|}

Final

|}

Final standings

See also
2021 FIVB Volleyball Boys' U19 World Championship

References

External links
 Official website

FIVB Volleyball Girls' U18 World Championship
FIVB Volleyball Girls' U18 World Championship
International volleyball competitions hosted by Mexico
FIVB
FIVB